Stephen Church  is a writer and professor of medieval history at the University of East Anglia and is regarded as an expert on King John. In 2015 his book King John: England, Magna Carta, and the Making of a Tyrant was one of the Financial Times best books of the year.

Career
Church is an expert in Medieval History, specifically the 12th Century and works at the University of East Anglia School of History department which he joined in 1995 after completing his postgraduate work in London. He is a Fellow of the Royal Historical Society and the Society of Antiquaries of London. He is also a trustee of the Allen Brown Memorial Trust, where he organises the R. Allen Brown Memorial Lecture that is given at the opening of the Battle Conference on Anglo-Norman Studies. The Trust also gives conference bursaries for postgraduate students and sponsors sessions at other conferences and a postgraduate reading group.

Since 1994 he has written several articles (including for the journal History) and books on Medieval History, and is a regular conference organiser and speaker on the subject of King John. Church has been regularly acknowledged as strong support to fellow Historians in their writing and has lectured in Europe on the subject of the Plantagenet Empire. In 2010 he co-lead with Professor Elisabeth Tyler (University of York) two reading groups which aimed to read Orderic Vitalis's Historica ecclesiastica from start to finish and reflect on its content. In 2015 he appeared on Saturday Extra on Australian station ABC Radio with Nicholas Cowdery to discuss why does Magna Carta still matter, and co-presented the BBC programme The Last Journey of the Magna Carta King, part of the BBC Taking Liberties season, with archaeologist Dr Ben Robinson.

Publications

Books
 2017 – Henry III: A Simple and God-Fearing King 
 2015 – King John: England, Magna Carta, and the Making of a Tyrant 
 2015 – King John and the Road to Magna Carta 
 2007 – King John: New Interpretations 
 2007 – Dialogus de Scaccario, and Constitutio Domus Regis The Dialogue of the Exchequer, and The Disposition of the Royal Household (Oxford Medieval Texts) 
 2001 – The Pakenham Cartulary for the Manor of Ixworth Thorpe, Suffolk, c.1250-c.1320 (17) (Suffolk Charters) 
 1999 – The Household Knights of King John 
 1994 – Medieval Knighthood V (with Ruth Harvey)

Selected published articles
 2017 – Political Discourse at the Court of Henry II and the Making of the New Kingdom of Ireland: The Evidence of John’s Title dominus Hibernie – History pg.808–823 ISSN 0018-2648
 2016 – Stephen: The Reign of Anarchy. By Carl Watkins. Penguin Monarchs Series. Allen Lane – History pg.772–773 ISSN 0018-2648
 2010 – King John’s Testament and the Last Days of his Reign – English Historical Review pg.505–528 ISSN 1477-4534
 2009 – The care of the royal tombs in English cathedrals in the nineteenth and twentieth centuries: the case of the effigy of King John at Worcester – The Antiquaries Journal ISSN 1758-5309
 2008 – Paganism in conversion age Anglo Saxon England: the evidence of Bede's Ecclesiastical History reconsidered – History pg.162–180 ISSN 1468-229X
 2007 – Aspects of the royal itinerary in twelfth-century England – Thirteenth Century England pg.31–45 ISSN 0269-6967
 1995 – The rewards of royal service in the household of King John: a dissenting opinion – English Historical Review pg.277–302 ISSN 1477-4534
 1994 – The earliest English muster roll, 18/19 December 1215 – Historical Research pg.1–17 ISSN 1468-2281

References

Living people
Academics of the University of East Anglia
BBC television presenters
British medievalists
Fellows of the Royal Historical Society
Fellows of the Society of Antiquaries of London
Year of birth missing (living people)